Flachsmann the Educator is a 1930 German comedy film directed by Carl Heinz Wolff and starring Paul Henckels, Charlotte Ander and Alfred Braun. It was shot at the Babelsberg Studios in Berlin. The film's sets were designed by the art director Willi Herrmann.

Cast
 Paul Henckels as Jügen Heinrich Flachsmann
 Charlotte Ander as Gisa Holm
 Alfred Braun as Jan Flemming
 Gustav Rickelt as Schulrat Prell
 Hedwig Wangel as Mutter von Jan Flemming
 Lionel Royce as Karsten Diercks
 Kurt Lilien as Schuldiener Negendank
 Carl de Vogt as Vogelsang
 Rolf Weih as Römer
 Wilhelm P. Krüger as Weidenbaum
 Hans Sternberg as Riemann
 Mathilde Sussin as Betty Sturhahn

References

Bibliography

External links 
 

1930 films
1930 comedy films
Films of the Weimar Republic
German comedy films
1930s German-language films
Films directed by Carl Heinz Wolff
National Film films
German films based on plays
Remakes of German films
Sound film remakes of silent films
German black-and-white films
1930s German films
Films shot at Babelsberg Studios